Launch control is an electronic aid to assist drivers of both racing and street cars to accelerate from a standing start. Motorcycles have been variously fitted with mechanical and electronic devices for both street and race.

Popular automobiles with launch control include the BMW M series, certain marques of the Volkswagen Group with Direct-Shift Gearbox (most notably the Bugatti Veyron), Porsche 911 (sport+ mode), Panamera Turbo, Alfa Romeo with TCT gearbox and certain General Motors products. Mitsubishi also incorporated launch control into their Twin Clutch SST gearbox, on its "S-Sport" mode, but the mode is only available in the Evolution X MR and MR Touring (USDM). The Jaguar F-Type includes launch control. The Nissan GT-R has electronics to control launch but the company does not use the term "launch control" since some owners have equated the term with turning off the stability control to launch the car, which may void the warranty of the drivetrain. One version of Nissan GT-R allows user to launch the car by turning the Traction Control to "R" mode.

Operation
Launch control operates by using an electronic accelerator and a computer program. The software controls acceleration based on engine specifications to make the car accelerate smoothly and as fast as possible, avoiding spinning of the drive wheels, engine failure due to over-revving and clutch and gearbox problems. Looking more in depth, launch control holds the engines RPM at a set number allowing for the car to build power before the computer or operator disengages the clutch. In racing cars, this feature is only available at the start of the race, when the car is stationary in the starting grid. After the car is running at a certain speed, the software is disabled.

Aftermarket launch control 

 Two-Step Rev Limiting 

Modern vehicles are increasingly becoming equipped with launch control features available straight from the factory. However, if a vehicle doesn’t come equipped with such features, then aftermarket forms of launch control can be purchased and installed. A common form of aftermarket launch control is commonly known as two-step rev limiting. A two-step rev limiter is a module that regulates the engines rpms for a controlled launch and optimal power settings. Two step limiting confines rpms at two sperate points. The first point is programmed to limit the revolutions to a desirable launch range and the second point is limited to protect the engine from over revving. The limiting itself is controlled through the modulator by regulating the fuel and ignition. Once the desired revolutions are met the two-step system will adjust these parameters allowing for power production to cease until released. Its important to note that two step rev limitation is only a viable option with a manual transmission car. Launch control for an automatic transmission car requires a different set up.

Reason for use
Racing drivers have only a very short time at the start of a race in which to achieve competitive acceleration. High power delivery to the gearbox and driven wheels cannot easily be managed even by the most skilled drivers. 

Launch control was originally intended to give cars the ability to accelerate as fast as possible regarding optimal engine conditions from a stop. However, car communities around the United States have begun to organize events surrounded around the byproduct of launch control systems, this byproduct is usually called a backfire. Using aftermarket launch control systems allows for drivers to manipulate the fuel and ignition settings. To create a backfire, the ignition settings are turned down allowing for a build up of excess fuel which creates a larger combustion producing loud bangs and pops from the exhaust. In some instances the launch control systems are modified to produce large flames that also expel from the exhaust pipe. Competitions are held in car communities based on achieving the loudest backfire or producing the largest flame.

History
Developments in electronics in the 1980s enabled the introduction of launch control.

In 1985, Renault's RE60 F1 car stored information on a diskette which was later unloaded at the pits, giving the engineers detailed data about the car's behavior. Later, telemetry allowed the data to be sent by radio between the pits and the car. Increasing the use of electronics on the car allowed engineers to modify the settings of certain parameters whilst it was on the track, which is called bi-directional telemetry.

Among the electronic driving aids were a semi-automatic transmission, an anti-lock braking system (ABS), a traction control system, and active suspension. The 1993 Williams FW15C model featured all of these aids. This trend was ended by the FIA when it outlawed these aids for the 1994 season, considering that they reduced the importance of driver skill to too great a degree. Bi-directional telemetry was also forbidden, which was soon reinstated as the FIA found it too hard to analyze the engine programmes in order to search for hidden code that could be found breaking the rules.

Fully-automatic transmissions, traction control, and launch control were allowed again from the 2001 Spanish Grand Prix, but as of the 2004 and 2008 season, they were outlawed in order to reduce the money needed for a competitive F1 team.

From being a feature that was predominately seen only in race cars, launch control is now featured in almost all modern consumer car brands. Brands such as BMW, Dodge, and Mercedes all have implemented a launch feature in select models of their vehicles.

Motorcycle usage
Street motorcycles have been fitted with factory devices to balance power characteristics to rider requirements. Competition entrants can call it "holeshot". Race machines are increasingly using additional suspension-altering technology to lower the stance and aid aerodynamics.

Motocross bikes use mechanical holeshot devices to temporarily compress the front suspension prior to race-start.

Gallery

References

External links
 Ford Falcon XR6 Turbo Launch control
 Cars With Launch Control: Houston, We Have Lift Off!

Automotive technologies
Formula One
Mechanical power control